Jaime Rimazza (born 12 December 1946) is a Bolivian footballer. He played in three matches for the Bolivia national football team from 1975 to 1977. He was also part of Bolivia's squad for the 1975 Copa América tournament.

References

External links
 

1946 births
Living people
Bolivian footballers
Bolivia international footballers
Place of birth missing (living people)
Association football midfielders
Club Bolívar players